This is a list of monuments in Dingli, Malta, which are listed on the National Inventory of the Cultural Property of the Maltese Islands., as well as Grade 1 scheduled properties from the Malta Scheduled Property Register maintained by Malta's Planning Authority. The latter are denoted by an ID beginning with the letters MSPR.

List 

|}

References

Dingli
Dingli